The Shalvi River is a tributary of the Yamuna (or Jamuna) River. The Shalvi meets the Jamuna once it flows down from western Himalayas.

Shalvi as a word means "Peace of God" derived of Shalviya.

There is a Hydroelectric power plant on Shalvi river producing 7 MW of electricity in Himachal Pradesh.

References

Yamuna River
Rivers of Himachal Pradesh
Rivers of India